Antimachus of Colophon, or of Claros, was a Greek poet and grammarian, who flourished about 400 BC.

Life 
Scarcely anything is known of his life. The Suda claims that he was a pupil of the poets Panyassis and Stesimbrotus.

Work 
His poetical efforts were not generally appreciated, although he received encouragement from his younger contemporary Plato (Plutarch, Lysander, 18). The emperor Hadrian, however, would later consider him superior to Homer.

His chief works were: an epic Thebaid, an account of the expedition of the Seven against Thebes and the war of the Epigoni; and an elegiac poem Lyde, so called from the poet's mistress, for whose death he endeavoured to find consolation telling stories from mythology of heroic disasters (Plutarch, Consul, ad Apoll. 9; Athenaeus xiii. 597).

Antimachus was the founder of "learned" epic poetry, and the forerunner of the Alexandrian school, whose critics allotted him the next place to Homer. He also prepared a critical recension of the Homeric poems.

He is to be distinguished from Antimachus of Teos, a much earlier poet to whom the lost Cyclic epic Epigoni was apparently ascribed (though the attribution may result from confusion).

Bibliography 
 Fragments, ed. Stoll (1845); Bergk
 Poetae Lyrici Graeci (1882); Kinkel
 Fragmenta epicorum Graecorum (1877). 20th century ed: V.J. Matthews
 Antimachus of Colophon, text and commentary (Leiden : Brill, 1996)

References

Attribution:

External links
Antimachi colophonii reliquias, Henr. Guil. Stoll (ed.), Dillenburgi apud ed. Pagenstecher, 1845.
 Poetae Lyrici Graeci. Recensuit Theodorus Bergk. Editionis quartae. Vol. 2. Lipsiae in aedibus B. G. Teubneri, 1882, pagg. 289-94.
 Epicorum graecorum fragmenta, Godofredus Kinkel (ed.), vol. 1, Lipsiae in aedibus B. G. Teubneri, pagg. 273-75.
Scholarly Bibliography for Antimachus, at A Hellenistic Bibliography, by Martine Cuypers

Ancient Greek grammarians
Ancient Greek poets
Ancient Greek epic poets
Ancient Greek elegiac poets
4th-century BC poets
Ancient Colophonians
Year of birth unknown
Year of death unknown